Al-Haykal is a sub-district located in Dhi Na'im District, Al Bayda Governorate, Yemen.  Al-Haykal had a population of 4957 according to the 2004 census.

References 

Sub-districts in Dhi Na'im District